Continental Paper Bag Co. v. Eastern Paper Bag Co., 210 U.S. 405 (1908), was a case in which the Supreme Court of the United States established the principle that patent holders have no obligation to use their patent.

Facts 

Eastern Paper Bag brought an action to prevent its competitor Continental Paper Bag from using its patent for a "self-opening" paper bag. Continental Paper Bag alleged that Eastern Paper Bag was not using its patent but simply trying to suppress competition.

Decision of the Supreme Court 

The Supreme Court rejected this argument by Continental Paper Bag, holding that it was the essence of the patent to exclude others without question of motive.

See also
List of United States Supreme Court cases, volume 210
Hartford-Empire Co. v. United States,

Further reading

External links

United States Supreme Court cases
United States Supreme Court cases of the Fuller Court
United States patent case law
United States antitrust case law
1908 in United States case law
Bags